Darrel R. Falk (born 1946) is an American biologist. He is Professor Emeritus of Biology at Point Loma Nazarene University and is the past president and a current senior advisor with BioLogos Foundation,
an advocacy group that emphasizes compatibility between science and Christian faith.

Education
Falk attended Simon Fraser University, originally planning to become a medical doctor. In his second university semester, he signed up for Introduction to Biology, Genetics, and Developmental Biology. Falk graduated from Simon Fraser University in 1968 with a Bachelor of Science degree in Biology. He then completed his Ph.D. from the University of Alberta in 1973.

Career and research
He did post-doctoral studies at the University of British Columbia (1973–74) and at the University of California at Irvine, California (1974–76). He was an Assistant/Associate Professor at Syracuse University  from 1976 to 1984. Then a professor at Mount Vernon Nazarene College in Ohio from 1984 to 1988. Since 1988, he has been a professor at Point Loma Nazarene University.

His research interests have included molecular genetics of Drosophila melanogaster, organization of genes; and mechanism of repair of chromosome breaks.

Falk is a Christian and believes in theistic evolution. He is the past president (2009-2012) of The BioLogos Foundation, founded by geneticist Francis Collins, which seeks to find "harmony between science and biblical faith" by advocating for "an evolutionary understanding of God’s creation".

He has authored a book on the creation–evolution controversy titled Coming to Peace with Science: Bridging the Worlds Between Faith and Biology (InterVarsity Press, 2004), with a foreword by Collins. He has been critical of the intelligent design movement and written about the movement frequently on The BioLogos Foundation's website.

Publications
Coming to Peace with Science: Bridging the Worlds Between Faith and Biology (InterVarsity Press, 2004)
Affirming: The Brightening Lamp (with Arthur F. Seamans) (Point Loma Press, 2002)

References

External links
Point Loma Nazarene University Bio
BioLogos Foundation Bio

1946 births
Living people
American Christians
American geneticists
University of Alberta alumni
Simon Fraser University alumni
Point Loma Nazarene University faculty
Syracuse University faculty
Mount Vernon Nazarene University faculty
Theistic evolutionists